James Orville Tuttle (September 18, 1912 – April 20, 1978) was an American football player and coach. He played professionally as   guard for six seasons with the New York Giants in the National Football League (NFL). Tuttle played college football at Oklahoma City University. He returned to his alma mater, Oklahoma City, to serve as head football coach during the program's final two years, 1948 and 1949.

Head coaching record

References

External links
 
 

1912 births
1978 deaths
American football guards
New York Giants players
Oklahoma City Chiefs football coaches
Oklahoma City Chiefs football players
People from Bartlesville, Oklahoma
People from Texas County, Missouri
Players of American football from Oklahoma